Nanterre 92 is a professional basketball club from the city of Nanterre (a western suburb of Paris), France.  The club plays in the top-tier level basketball league in France, the Pro A, since 2011. Founded in 2011 as JSF Nanterre, the club plays its home games in the Palais des Sports, which has a capacity of 3,000 people. The honor list of Nanterre includes one French championship and two French Cup titles as well as a FIBA Europe Cup championship.

History
Nanterre 92 played in the French 2nd Division, for the first time, in the 2004–05 season. In 2007, the club made it to the finals of the French Cup. In 2011, the club won the French 2nd Division championship, and got promoted to the top national domestic level French League.

In the 2012–13 French League season, after finishing in the eighth position of the regular season, Nanterre 92 won its first top-tier national domestic title, and thus qualified to play in the European-wide top-tier level EuroLeague, in the 2013–14 season.

In the French League 2013–14 season, Nanterre didn't manage to reach the league's playoffs, after finishing 10th in the Pro A regular season. Despite the disappointment in the national league competition, Nanterre 92 won the French Cup title that season. They beat SLUC Nancy Basket, by a score of 55–50, in the Cup's Final. In the French Leaders Cup, Nanterre 92 also reached the Cup Final, but lost to Le Mans Sarthe Basket. Nanterre also made its debut in the EuroLeague that season.

To start the 2014–15 season, Nanterre won the Match des Champions (French Super Cup). On April 26, 2015, Nanterre won its first European-wide trophy. In the 2015, EuroChallenge Final, it beat Trabzsonspor, 63–64, on a buzzer-beater by T.J. Campbell.

In February 2016, the team's name was changed from JSF Nanterre, to Nanterre 92, with "92" representing the numeric code of the club's home department of Hauts-de-Seine.

Arenas
Nanterre 92 plays its home French League national domestic league games, and home EuroCup games, at the 3,000 seat Palais des Sports Maurice Thorez. For home EuroLeague games, when the club played in that competition, in the 2013–14 season, they used the Halle Georges Carpentier, which has a capacity of 5,009 seats for basketball. 

On 11 March, 2018, Nanterre 92 beat ASVEL Basket, by a score of 81–80, in a French League 2017–18 season game, which was held at the U Arena. The game had an attendance of 15,220, which was the highest attendance of any game in the French League's history.

Logos

Season by season

Trophies

Domestic 
French League
 Champion (1): 2012–13
French Cup
 Winners (2): 2013–14, 2016–17
 Runners-up: 2006–07, 2012–13
French Super Cup
 Winners (2): 2014, 2017
 Runners-up (1): 2013
French League 2
 Champion (1): 2010–11

European 
FIBA Europe Cup
 Champion (1): 2016–17
FIBA EuroChallenge
 Champion (1): 2014–15

Players

Current roster

Notable players

Head coaches
 Pascal Donnadieu

References

External links
 Official website
 Former official website 
 Former official website 
 Nanterre 92 at Eurobasket.com

Nanterre
Basketball teams in France
Basketball teams established in 1927